Eddy Creek may refer to:

Eddy Creek (Kentucky), a stream in Caldwell and Lyon counties
Eddy Creek (Lackawanna River), a stream in Pennsylvania